Kyle James N. Patterson (born 6 January 1986) is an English footballer who plays for Midland League Premier league side Lichfield City, where he plays as a midfielder.

Playing career

Youth and college
Patterson was signed by English club West Bromwich Albion's youth academy in 1999 at the age of thirteen, and subsequently spent five years with the club, scoring more than 50 goals for the club while winning the Youth Alliance League and Midland Youth Cup.

Patterson played with Finnish club TP-47 from January 2005 to December 2005, before moving to the United States to play college soccer at St. Louis University, where he was named the Atlantic 10 Offensive Player of the Year in 2007.

During his collegiate years Patterson also played in the USL Premier Development League with St. Louis Lions.

Professional
Patterson was drafted in the fourth round (48th overall) of the 2009 MLS SuperDraft by Los Angeles Galaxy. He made his professional debut on 22 March 2009, in Galaxy's first game of the 2009 MLS season against D.C. United, and provided the assist on Landon Donovan's equalising goal.

With the MLS Reserve Division having been scrapped at the end of 2008, Galaxy briefly loaned Patterson to the Hollywood United Hitmen of the USL Premier Development League to maintain his match fitness levels. He made his debut, and scored a goal, in Hollywood's 4–0 victory over Ventura County Fusion on 8 May 2009.

Patterson was waived by Galaxy on 25 November 2009, having played in three MLS games for the team, and later signed with the Swedish Allsvenskan club GAIS.

Patterson left GAIS later that year, and after attending trials with several professional clubs in England, joined Hednesford Town. He made his debut on 30 August against Didcot Town, scoring twice in a 3–0 win.

Tamworth
On 14 June 2011, Patterson was confirmed as Marcus Law's first signing for Tamworth, Patterson signed a one-year contract with the club holding another year's option.

Nuneaton Town
With a day to go until the first game of the season, Patterson left The Lambs to join local rivals Nuneaton Town.

Hednesford Town
On 21 February 2013, Patterson joined one of his former clubs, Hednesford Town, on loan for the rest of the 2012–13 season.

Redditch United
On 17 May 2016, Patterson was named as assistant manager to Darren Byfield at Redditch United.

Career statistics
Statistics accurate as of match played 28 April 2012.

References

External links

 GAIS profile
 Player's Agent Licensed by the FA – Chiron Sports & Media

1986 births
Living people
Footballers from Birmingham, West Midlands
English footballers
Association football forwards
West Bromwich Albion F.C. players
Saint Louis Billikens men's soccer players
TP-47 players
St. Louis Lions players
LA Galaxy players
Hollywood United Hitmen players
GAIS players
Hednesford Town F.C. players
Tamworth F.C. players
Nuneaton Borough F.C. players
Worcester City F.C. players
Redditch United F.C. players
Halesowen Town F.C. players
Shepshed Dynamo F.C. players
Lichfield City F.C. players
Major League Soccer players
USL League Two players
Allsvenskan players
National League (English football) players
Southern Football League players
LA Galaxy draft picks
English expatriate footballers
English expatriate sportspeople in Finland
English expatriate sportspeople in the United States
Expatriate soccer players in the United States
Expatriate footballers in Sweden
Association football player-managers
Veikkausliiga players